The Palisades Cemetery is located on the cuesta, or descending ridge of the Palisades in North Bergen, New Jersey. Its main entrance on Bergen Turnpike and Union Turnpike. It is adjacent to the Weehawken Cemetery and is one of several on the western slope of North Hudson County.

See also
 List of cemeteries in Hudson County, New Jersey

References

External links
 

North Bergen, New Jersey
Cemeteries in Hudson County, New Jersey